Gesualdi is a surname of Italian origin. Notable people with the surname include:

Carlos Rodrigues Gesualdi (born 1963), Argentinean writer, teacher, lecturer and translator
Juan Gesualdi (born 1929), Argentine equestrian

References

Surnames of Italian origin